The Campeonato Brasileiro de Futebol Feminino Série A3 (Brazilian Women's National Championship Third Level) is an annual Brazilian women's club football tournament organized by the CBF.

History
On May 18, 2021, the Brazilian Football Confederation (CBF) announced the creation of the competition.  The tournament was created due to the unevenness in the first phase of the Campeonato Brasileiro de Futebol Feminino Série A2, with teams in a “comfort zone”, as they know they have five games guaranteed and a prize pool to meet that table. This results in routs at the beginning of the competition.

Distribution

In 2022
 One representative from each of the 27 states;
 A club from the best federation in the RNF (National Ranking of Federations) 
 The top 4 in the CBF Ranking (male) that are not already in the Campeonato Brasileiro de Futebol Feminino Série A1 and Campeonato Brasileiro de Futebol Feminino Série A2.

 32 Associations.

In 2023
 One representative from each of the 27 states;
 A club from the best federation in the RNF (National Ranking of Federations)
 The 4 teams relegated from the previous year's Série A2;

 32 Associations.

List of Champions

Below is a list of all Campeonato Brasileiro Série A3 champions:

See also
Sport in Brazil
Football in Brazil
Women's football in Brazil
Campeonato Brasileiro Feminino Série A1
Campeonato Brasileiro Feminino Série A2
Copa do Brasil de Futebol Feminino
Copa Libertadores Femenina

Notes

References

External links
Official website 
soccerway.com, fixtures and results

Brasileiro de Futebol Feminino